Antonio de Jesús López Amenábar (born 10 April 1997) is a professional footballer who plays as a midfielder for Liga Nacional club Municipal, on loan from América. Born in Mexico, he represents the Guatemala national team.

Club career
López began his career in the U-15 category of Club América in 2012. For the Liga MX Apertura 2018 tournament, América's head coach Miguel Herrera decided to register him in the first team roster. On 22 July 2018 he made his Liga MX debut coming in as a substitute for Henry Martín on the 83rd minute of the match against Club Necaxa.

International career
Despite being born in Mexico, his Guatemalan ancestry allowed López to be summoned by the Guatemala national team since his maternal grandfather is from Quetzaltenango, Guatemala. On 23 September 2020, he received his first call-up for Guatemala by manager Amarini Villatoro for a friendly match against Mexico.

Career statistics

International

Honours
América
Liga MX: Apertura 2018
Copa MX: Clausura 2019
Campeón de Campeones: 2019

References

External links

1997 births
Living people
Footballers from Mexico City
People with acquired Guatemalan citizenship
Guatemalan footballers
Guatemala international footballers
Mexican footballers
Mexican people of Guatemalan descent
Sportspeople of Guatemalan descent
Club América footballers
Association football midfielders
Liga MX players